Moulin-Neuf may refer to the following places in France:

 Moulin-Neuf, Ariège, a commune of the Ariège département
 Moulin-Neuf, Dordogne, a commune of the Dordogne département

oc:Molin Nòu